The 2009–10 Serbian League East season was the seventh season of the league under its current title. It began on 15 August 2009 and ended on 6 June 2010.

League table

External links
 Football Association of Serbia
 Football Association of East Serbia

Serbian League East seasons
3
Serbia